Clivina gerstmeieri is a species of ground beetle in the subfamily Scaritinae. It was described by Baehr in 1989.

References

gerstmeieri
Beetles described in 1989